The following is a timeline of the history of the city of Brownsville, Texas, USA.

18th-19th centuries

 1771 - José Salvador de la Garza settles in area per Espíritu Santo land grant.
 1846
 March: Fort Taylor established by Zachary Taylor.
 May 8: Battle of Palo Alto.
 1848 - Brownsville founded by Charles Stillman.
 1849
 Travellers of the California Gold Rush pass through town.
 Stillman house built.
 Brownsville Lyceum founded.
 1850
 Market Square built.
 Sentinel newspaper begins publication.
 Population: 2,734.
 1853 - "Police force" established.
 1859
 First Cortina War.
 Immaculate Conception Church built.
 1863 - November 2–6: Battle of Brownsville; Union wins.
 1865
 May 12–13: Battle of Palmito Ranch fought near Brownsville; Confederates win.
 Saint Joseph Academy established.
 1867 - Hurricane.
 1870
 Point Isabel-Brownsville railway built.
 Population: 4,905.
 1874 - Roman Catholic apostolic vicariate of Brownsville established.
 1875 - Porfirio Díaz plots Mexican coup from his temporary base in Brownsville.
 1877 - Alonso house built.
 1878 - Sabas Cavazos Cemetery established.
 1883 - Cameron County Courthouse built.
 1890 - Population: 6,134.
 1892 - Daily Herald newspaper begins publication.
 1900 - Population: 6,305.

20th century

 1903 - St. Louis, Brownsville and Mexico Railway begins operating.
 1906 - August: Brownsville Affair (racial unrest).
 1907 - Snakeville in business.
 1910
 Brownsville & Matamoros International Bridge opens.
 Dittmann Theater (cinema) built.
 Population: 10,517.
 1913 - County Jail built.
 1914 - New Cameron County Courthouse built.
 1926 - Junior College of the Lower Rio Grande Valley established.
 1927 - KGFI radio begins broadcasting.
 1930 - Population: 22,021.
 1934 - El Heraldo de Brownsville newspaper begins publication.
 1936 - Port of Brownsville opens.
 1938 - Matamoros-Brownsville Charro Days Festival begins.
 1945 - U.S. Army Fort Brown decommissioned.
 1946 - Teatro Victoria in business.
 1949 - Charro Drive-In cinema and Majestic Theatre in business.
 1950
 Texas Southmost College active.
 Population: 35,086.
 1960
 Stillman House Museum opens.
 Population: 48,040.
 1965 - Roman Catholic Diocese of Brownsville established.
 1970 - Population: 52,522.
 1971 - Gladys Porter Zoo established.
 1978 - Palo Alto Battlefield National Historic Site established.  (Palo Alto Battlefield National Historical Park since 2009.)
 1979 - Brownsville Urban System (transport) established.
 1980 - Population: 84,997.
 1990 - Population: 98,962.
 1991
 University of Texas at Brownsville active.
 Pat Ahumada becomes mayor.
 1997 - City website online (approximate date).
 1999 - Blanca Vela becomes mayor.
 2000 - Population: 139,722.

21st century

 2001 - El Nuevo Heraldo newspaper in publication.
 2007 - Pat Ahumada becomes mayor again.
 2010 - Population: 175,023.
 2013 - Filemon Vela, Jr. becomes U.S. representative for Texas's 34th congressional district.
 2018 - Trey Mendez elected mayor

See also
 Brownsville, Texas history
 Matamoros, Mexico history
 National Register of Historic Places listings in Cameron County, Texas
 Timelines of other cities in the South Texas area of Texas: Corpus Christi, Laredo, McAllen, San Antonio

References

Bibliography

 
 W. H. Chatfield, The Twin Cities of the Border and the Country of the Lower Rio Grande (New Orleans: Brandao, 1893)
 
  + chronology
  Betty Bay. Historic Brownsville: Original Townsite Guide (Brownsville, Texas: Brownsville Historical Association, 1980)
 Robert B. Vezzetti and Ruby A. Wooldridge, Brownsville: A Pictorial History (Virginia Beach, Virginia: Donning, 1982)
 Milo Kearney, ed., Studies in Brownsville History (Pan American University at Brownsville, 1986)
 Milo Kearney and Anthony Knopp, Boom and Bust: The Historical Cycles of Matamoros and Brownsville (Austin: Eakin Press, 1991)
 Milo Kearney, ed., Still More Studies in Brownsville History (University of Texas at Brownsville, 1991)

External links

 
 
 
 Items related to Brownsville, various dates (via Digital Public Library of America).

 
brownsville